Tritia neritea is a species of sea snail, a marine gastropod mollusk in the family Nassariidae, the Nassa mud snails or dog whelks.

List of synonyms
 
 Buccinum neriteum Linnaeus, 1758 (original combination)
 Cyclonassa carinata Coen, 1933
 Cyclonassa diluta Coen, 1937
 Cyclonassa fasciata Coen, 1933
 Cyclonassa kamischiensis [sic] (misspelling of Cyclope kamiesch (Chenu, 1859))
 Cyclonassa kamischiensis var. atra Milaschewitsch, 1916
 Cyclonassa kamischiensis var. exigua Milaschewitsch, 1916
 Cyclonassa neritea (Linnaeus, 1758)
 Cyclonassa neritea var. callosa Pallary, 1912
 Cyclonassa neritea var. compacta Pallary, 1919
 Cyclonassa neritea var. depressa Pallary, 1919
 Cyclonassa neritea var. elongata Pallary, 1919
 Cyclonassa neritea var. globulosa Pallary, 1919
 Cyclonassa neritea var. inflata Pallary, 1919
 Cyclonassa neritea var. kamieschensis Pallary, 1919 (unjustified emendation of Cyclops kamiesch Chenu)
 Cyclonassa neritea var. kamieschensis communis Pallary, 1919
 Cyclonassa neritea var. kamieschensis discoidea Pallary, 1919
 Cyclonassa neritea var. kamieschensis gibba Pallary, 1919
 Cyclonassa neritea var. kamieschensis lactescens Pallary, 1919
 Cyclonassa neritea var. minuta Pallary, 1919
 Cyclonassa neritea var. mucronata Pallary, 1919
 Cyclonassa neritea var. platystoma Pallary, 1919
 Cyclonassa vayssierei Pallary, 1903
 Cyclonassa vernicata Coen, 1933
 Cyclope neritea (Linnaeus, 1758)
 Cyclope neritoidea Risso, 1826 (Unnecessary substitute name for Buccinum neriteum Linnaeus, 1758)
 Cyclope tarentina Parenzan, 1970
 Cyclope westerlundi Brusina, 1900
 Cyclops asterizans de Montfort, 1810
 Cyclops kamiesch Chenu, 1859
 Nana neritea (Linnaeus, 1758)
 Nanina unifasciata Risso, 1826
 Nassa inflata Locard & Caziot, 1900
 Nassa italica Issel, 1870
 Nassa minor Weinkauff, 1868
 Nassa neritea (Linnaeus, 1758) (unaccepted generic combination)
 Nassa neritea var. albida Requien, 1848
 Nassa neritea var. lutescens Requien, 1848
 Nassa neritea var. major Requien, 1848
 Nassa neritea var. media Requien, 1848
 Nassa neritea var. minima Requien, 1848
 Nassa neritoides Lamarck, 1816
 Nassa unifasciata Paolucci, 1871
 Neritula nana Locard, 1887
 Neritula nana var. mucronata Locard, 1887
 Tritia westerlundi (Brusina, 1900)

Description
The length of the shell varies between 5 mm and 25 mm.

The hemispherical shell is smooth, depressed, convex above and flattened beneath. The blunt spire is formed of four indistinct whorls, entirely smooth. The aperture is ovate, reddish, rather small and obliquely emarginated. The outer lip is smooth and slightly margined. The columella is arcuated towards the middle, furnished with a wide, reddish, and almost circular callosity, which extends upon the body of the body whorl. The coloring is slightly variable, it is generally of a yellowish or reddish white, with brown lines, and two decurrent, interrupted, or articulated bands, one of which surrounds the suture, and the other only borders the circumference. The epidermis is thick and brown.

Distribution
This species occurs in the Mediterranean Sea and in the Black Sea.

References

 Lamarck J.B. (1816). Liste des objets représentés dans les planches de cette livraison. In: Tableau encyclopédique et méthodique des trois règnes de la Nature. Mollusques et Polypes divers. Agasse, Paris. 16 pp.
 Chenu J. C. (1859-1862). Manuel de Conchyliologie et de Paléontologie conchyliologique. Paris
 Coen, G. (1933). Saggio di una Sylloge Molluscorum Adriaticorum. Memorie del Regio Comitato Talassografico Italiano. 192: i-vii, 1-186
 Morton J. (1960) The habits of Cyclope neritea, a style-bearing stenoglossan gastropod. Proceedings of the Malacological Society of London, 34(2): 96–105.
 Cernohorsky W. O. (1984). Systematics of the family Nassariidae (Mollusca: Gastropoda). Bulletin of the Auckland Institute and Museum 14: 1–356
 Gofas, S.; Le Renard, J.; Bouchet, P. (2001). Mollusca. in: Costello, M.J. et al. (eds), European Register of Marine Species: a check-list of the marine species in Europe and a bibliography of guides to their identification. Patrimoines Naturels. 50: 180–213
 Streftaris, N.; Zenetos, A.; Papathanassiou, E. (2005). Globalisation in marine ecosystems: the story of non-indigenous marine species across European seas. Oceanogr. Mar. Biol. Annu. Rev. 43: 419–453

External links
 
 Linnaeus, C. (1758). Systema Naturae per regna tria naturae, secundum classes, ordines, genera, species, cum characteribus, differentiis, synonymis, locis. Editio decima, reformata (10th revised edition), vol. 1: 824 pp. Laurentius Salvius: Holmiae
 Brusina, S. (1900). Zur Molluskenfauna des Mittelmeeres. Nachrichtsblatt der deutschen malakozoologischen Gesellschaft. 32(5-6): 86-89.
 Risso, A. (1826-1827). Histoire naturelle des principales productions de l'Europe Méridionale et particulièrement de celles des environs de Nice et des Alpes Maritimes. Paris, F.G. Levrault. 3(XVI): 1-480, 14 pls.
 Montfort P. [Denys de. (1808-1810). Conchyliologie systématique et classification méthodique des coquilles. Paris: Schoell. Vol. 1: pp. lxxxvii + 409 (1808). Vol. 2: pp. 676 + 16 (1810)]
 Locard, A. & Caziot, E. (1900-1901). Les coquilles marines des côtes de Corse. Annales de la Société Linnéenne de Lyon. 46
 Locard, A. (1887). Contributions à la faune malacologique française. X. Monographie des espèces de la famille des Buccinidae. Annales de la Société Linnéenne de Lyon. 33: 17-127, 1 pl.
 Pallary, P. (1919). Le Cyclonassa neritea et ses dérivations. Journal de Conchyliologie. 64, 1-11
 Pallary, P. (1903). Addition à la faune conchyliologique de la Méditerranée. Ann. Mus. Hist. nat. Marseille, Zool. 8: 4-16, plate 1. Marseille
 Milaschewitch, K.O. (1916). Molluscs of Russian seas. Vol. I. Molluscs of the Black and Azov seas. Faune de la Russie et des pays limitrophes, 312 p.
 Pallary, P. (1912). Catalogue des mollusques du littoral méditerranéen de l'Egypte. Mémoires de l'Institut d'Egypte. 7(3): 69-207, pls 15-18
 Boissin, E.; Neglia, V.; Baksay, S.; Micu, D.; Bat, L.; Topaloglu, B.; Todorova, V.; Panayotova, M.; Kruschel, C.; Milchakova, N.; Voutsinas, E.; Beqiraj, S.; Nasto, I.; Aglieri, G.; Taviani, M.; Zane, L.; Planes, S. (2020). Chaotic genetic structure and past demographic expansion of the invasive gastropod Tritia neritea in its native range, the Mediterranean Sea. Scientific Reports. 10: 21624 (13 pp.)
 Galindo, L. A.; Puillandre, N.; Utge, J.; Lozouet, P.; Bouchet, P. (2016). The phylogeny and systematics of the Nassariidae revisited (Gastropoda, Buccinoidea). Molecular Phylogenetics and Evolution. 99: 337-353

neritea
Gastropods described in 1758
Taxa named by Carl Linnaeus